Supplemental Symbols and Pictographs is a Unicode block containing emoji characters. It extends the set of symbols included in the Miscellaneous Symbols and Pictographs block. It also includes Typikon symbols.

Emoji
The Unicode 14.0 Supplemental Symbols and Pictographs block contains 242 emoji, consisting of all the non-Typikon symbols except for the rifle and the pentathlon symbol. The rifle and the pentathlon emoji has been rejected due to its controversy, analogous to the redesign of the pistol emoji.

Chart

Emoji modifiers

The Supplemental Symbols and Pictographs block has 45 emoji that represent people or body parts.
These are designed to be used with the set of "Emoji modifiers"  defined in the Miscellaneous Symbols and Pictographs block. These are modifier characters intended to define the skin colour to be used for the emoji, based on the Fitzpatrick scale:

The following table shows the full combinations of the "human emoji" characters with each of the five modifiers, which should display each character in each of the five skin tones provided a suitable font is installed on the system and the rendering software is capable of handling modifier characters:

Additional human emoji can be found in other Unicode blocks: Dingbats, Emoticons, Miscellaneous Symbols, Miscellaneous Symbols and Pictographs, Symbols and Pictographs Extended-A and Transport and Map Symbols.

History
The following Unicode-related documents record the purpose and process of defining specific characters in the Supplemental Symbols and Pictographs block:

References 

Unicode blocks
Emoji